The Imbé River is a river in the state of Rio de Janeiro, Brazil.

The Segundo do Norte, Morumbeca, Aleluia and Mocotó rivers, which rise in the Desengano State Park, are tributaries of the Imbé River.
The Imbé flows into the Lagoa de Cima (Cima Lake). 
From that lake the Ururaí River flows to the Lagoa Feia.

See also
List of rivers of Rio de Janeiro

References

Sources

Rivers of Rio de Janeiro (state)